Lizette Alvarez (born October 30, 1964) is an American journalist, and has worked for more than two decades with The New York Times. She has served as the Miami bureau chief since January 2011. Alvarez has been a reporter for the New York Daily News, and The Miami Herald.

Alvarez was born in Miami, Florida October 30, 1964, the daughter of Cuban refugees. She graduated from Florida State University with a B.A. in 1986 and from Northwestern University with an M.S. degree in journalism in 1987. Alvarez is married to journalist Don Van Natta, Jr.; they have two daughters.

Biography 
Alvarez describes herself as "the daughter of Cuban refugees...raised to resist oppression and champion liberty." She began her career in journalism, working for the Miami Herald, in 1991, as an immigration reporter and Cuba correspondent. One of her early stories, "Cuban Naval Defectors Tell of Life in Military," was published in February, 1992.

In August 1992, Alvarez, was one of nine people to survive the destructive effects of Hurricane Andrew, as they rode-out the storm in a small motel, fleeing to another room as the roof was ripped off where they tried to shelter themselves. Her husband, (who was her boyfriend at the time) was also a reporter for The Miami Herald; they were both part of the staff awarded the 1993 Pulitzer Prize for Public Service, for coverage of Hurricane Andrew and its aftermath. Later, she published her personal story of the experience.

In 1995, Alvarez and fellow journalist, Lisa Getter, won the Goldsmith Prize for investigate reporting on, Lost in America: Our Failed Immigration Policy.

Years later, Alvarez was one of hundreds of journalists who joined in support of the formation of the newspaper union, One Herald Guild. She and her husband signed a petition and offered their testimonials, supporting the effort; Alvarez wrote:

In July 1995, Alvarez left Miami to work for the New York Times. She has worked for over two decades with the organization, beginning as an assignment reporter at the Metro-desk, in New York, and as of 2020, the Miami bureau chief, since 2011. She has served as a Washington correspondent, covering congress and reported on Northern Europe, while serving as the London bureau chief. In 2017, she elected to accept a buyout offer, as the Times shifted their newsroom operations.

Awards
 1993 Pulitzer Prize for Public Service, (with the staff of The Miami Herald), citing its coverage of Hurricane Andrew's destruction, including the contribution of "lax zoning, inspection, and building codes"
 1995 The Goldsmith Prize for Investigative Reporting, (with Lisa Getter), for "Lost in America: Our Failed Immigration Policy,” The Miami Herald 
 1996 The George Polk Award for Metro Reporting, (with Frank Bruni, Nina Bernstein, and Joyce Purnick) for their 1995 reporting on the New York City Child Welfare Administration, The New York Times
 2008 Peabody Award, (with the staff) for nytimes.com, awarded in recognition that "its website exemplifies a new age for the press, expanding its role in ways unimaginable only a few years."

References

External links
Alvarez at Twitter
City Room, Alvarez blog

1964 births
Living people
George Polk Award recipients
The New York Times writers
Miami Herald people
Florida State University alumni
Medill School of Journalism alumni
Writers from Miami
American women journalists
20th-century American journalists
20th-century American women
21st-century American women